Masci may refer to:

People
Angelo Masci, Italian writer
Carlo Masci (born 1958), Italian politician
Pope Nicholas IV, born Girolamo Masci, Italian Pope
Joseph Masci, American physician

Other
Manila Science High School, school in Manila, Philippines
Liceo scientifico Filippo Masci, school in Italy